The Australian Barbarians, nicknamed the "Baa-Baas", is an invitational rugby union team which has been a major part of Australian rugby since the team was founded in 1957. The club is based in Australia. The idea came from the concept of the Barbarian F.C. formed in Britain in 1890.

Results
Matches against international teams only. The listing may be incomplete.

Notes: Trial matches against the Australian Under-20 side, and other age-group teams, to assist in their preparation for international tournaments have also been played by the Australian Barbarians Rugby Club, but these results are not listed here.

 The Australian Barbarians team was nominated by the ARU as the second national team to play two matches against England in 2010. As such, it was essentially Australia A by another name for the 2010 England tour. The Australian Barbarians also played a pre-World Cup friendly against  in 2011.

 Players from the National Rugby Championship that were not contracted for Super Rugby were selected to play against a New Zealand side chosen from the Heartland Championship.

Current squad

Former players

See also

Brussels Barbarians
Fiji Barbarians
French Barbarians
New Zealand Barbarians
South African Barbarians

References

External links
 

Barbarian F.C.
International rugby union teams
Barbarians
Rugby clubs established in 1957
1957 establishments in Australia